Pokrovsk, formerly known as Krasnoarmiysk (until 2016) and Grishino (until 1934), is a city and the administrative center of Pokrovsk Raion in Donetsk Oblast, Ukraine. Prior to 2020, it was incorporated as a city of oblast significance.

Names
 2016–present: Pokrovsk
 1964–2016: Krasnoarmiysk or Krasnoarmeysk
 1938–1964: Krasnoarmeyskoye or Krasnoarmiyske
 1934–1938: Postyshevo or Postysheve
 1884–1934: Grishino or Hryshyne

History
Pokrovsk was founded as Grishino in 1875 by a decision of the Ministry of Railways of the Russian Empire for a railway station. The village had two thousand inhabitants.

In 1881, a locomotive depot which became one of the main locomotive repair companies Ekaterinoslavskaya railway was built in the town. Two years later, in 1883, increased the station building, the central portion of which survives to this day. In May 1884, trains finally began to go through the rail station in Grishino.

With the development of the railway station and Grishino grew, there were new businesses, and in particular began to develop deposits of underground minerals, starting with coal. By 1913, the population Grishino station has more than doubled and amounted to about 4.5 thousand people.

After the Russian Civil War ravaged Russia as a whole, Grishino station continued to build momentum and by 1925 had a locomotive depot, a brick factory, and six mines. The name of the station was changed to Postyshevo in 1934 to honor of Pavel Postyshev, and in 1938, the name of the city became Krasnoarmeyskoe commemorating the Soviet Red Army, after Postyshev was repressed during the Great Purge.

World War II placed a heavy burden on the shoulders of the population of the city. The first axis forces to arrive were Italians, followed by the Germans. The Soviet commanders had retreated prior to the arrival of these forces, having executed many young men in order to "avoid handing them over to the enemy" . The German forces proceeded to extract and transfer many civilians by train to forced labor camps in Austria. Many residents defended their hometown. 8295 Soviet soldiers perished on the battlefield, and 4788 residents of the town were killed in World War II. In February 1943 the Massacre of Grischino took place.

In the 1950s, in the post-war period, the city saw a large industrial and residential construction.

In the Russo-Ukrainian War (that started in the spring of 2014) the city is near the frontline with the separatists Donetsk People's Republic.

In May 2016, the city was renamed according to the Ukrainian decommunization process to Pokrovsk, honoring the Intercession of the Theotokos known as Pokrova in Ukrainian.

Demographics

The population of Pokrovsk as of August 1, 2017 was 75205 people.

According to 2001 Census data, the breakdown by ethnicity is:

Native language per Ukrainian Census of 2001:

Russian  59.8%
Ukrainian  39.4%
Armenian  0.2%
Belarusian  0.1%

Gallery

Notes

References

External links

Cities in Donetsk Oblast
Pokrovsk Raion
Populated places established in the Russian Empire
Bakhmutsky Uyezd
City name changes in Ukraine
Former Soviet toponymy in Ukraine